Verdirame is a surname. Notable people with the surname include:

Guglielmo Verdirame, Baron Verdirame, British and Italian lawyer and activist
Sergio Verdirame (born 1970), Argentine footballer

See also
Verderame

Italian-language surnames